Thayllon Lopes Medeiros (born 15 November 2001), commonly known as Thayllon Lopes or simply Thayllon, is a Brazilian professional footballer who plays as a right-winger and left-winger for Campeonato Brasileiro Série A club Grêmio, on loan from São José-RS.

Club career

Grêmio
Born in Porto Alegre, Brazil, Thayllon Lopes joined the Grêmio's Academy at the age of 18 in 2020 on loan from São José-RS.

Career statistics

Club

Honours
Grêmio
Campeonato Gaúcho: 2021
Recopa Gaúcha: 2021

References

External links

Profile at the Grêmio F.B.P.A. website

2001 births
Living people
Brazilian footballers
Association football forwards
Campeonato Brasileiro Série C players
Esporte Clube São José players
Grêmio Foot-Ball Porto Alegrense players
Footballers from Porto Alegre